Clairvoyance is the 1986 debut studio album by the alternative rock band Screaming Trees, produced by Steve Fisk. Released on Velvetone Records, the album helped the band earn a contract with SST Records.  While it is very much a combination of psychedelic and garage rock, it bears many similarities to early grunge. It was original limited to a pressing of 2,500 copies, which included full size, double sided inserts. In January of 2005, it was re-issued on CD by Hall of Records.

Steve Fisk stated that after completing the record he attempted to book a tour for the band and sent their album to local radio stations with little to no traction, stating that "no one wanted to hear about a band from Eastern Washington".

Critical reception

Soundgarden guitarist Kim Thayil listed Clairvoyance as one of his favourite grunge albums, stating: "I like Clairvoyance for the song “Clairvoyance,” but my favorite song on there is probably “I See Stars” followed by “Orange Airplane.” After this album, they kind of fattened up their sound."

Track listing

Personnel
 Screaming Trees
 Mark Lanegan – lead vocals, violin on "Strange Out Here"
 Gary Lee Conner – guitar, backing vocals, organ
 Van Conner – bass, backing vocals
 Mark Pickerel – percussion, drums

 Additional musicians
 Joey Conner – backing vocals on "Orange Airplane"
 Joanne Conner – backing vocals on "Clairvoyance"
 Steve Fisk – producer, piano on "Lonely Girl" and "Clairvoyance," organ on "The Turning"
 Michael Peterson – backing vocals on "Lonely Girl"

 Additional personnel
 Sam Albright – cover design
 John Golden – mastering

References

Screaming Trees albums
1986 debut albums
Albums produced by Steve Fisk